Brigadier-General Herbert Cokayne Frith,  (12 July 1861 – 1942) was a senior British Army officer who briefly served as General Officer Commanding 42nd (East Lancashire) Infantry Division during the First World War.

Military career
Frith was commissioned into the Somerset Light Infantry on 28 January 1882. He served with the Egyptian Army at the Battle of Ginnis in December 1885 and at the Battle of Toski in August 1889 during the Mahdist War. He became commanding officer of the 1st Battalion, Somerset Light Infantry in November 1909. He briefly served as acting General Officer Commanding 42nd (East Lancashire) Infantry Division from 29 December 1915 to 21 January 1916 in Egypt and again from 2 March 1917 to 10 March 1917 in France during the First World War.

He was appointed a Companion of the Order of the Bath for his services in Egypt on 3 June 1916.

References

1861 births
1942 deaths
Companions of the Order of the Bath
British Army brigadiers